Hahold (IV) from the kindred Hahót (fl. 1251–75) was a Hungarian noble.

Hahold IV was born into the Hahold branch of the gens Hahót as the son of Hahold III, who served as ispán of Vas County between 1237 and 1239. Hahold IV had two children: Matthew and Stephen I.

According to a diploma from 1255, Stephen Gutkeled, who functioned as Ban of Slavonia since 1248, ordered Hahold, who "then" was ispán of Rojcsa (today Rovišće, Croatia), to conduct a legal process. Thus Hahold held that position from around 1248 to 1255. Rojcsa was a border ispánate near Bjelovar, in the territory of Križevci County.

In the 1260s, he had several conflicts with the Gyüre kindred, neighboring landowners in Zala County, when Hahold's soldiers killed Thomas Gyüre along with his servants, who also acted as a royal emissary during that time. Already in the 1250s, Hahold arbitrarily seized the right to collect tithe to the Cathedral Chapter of Zagreb in the Gyüres' land. Following that Hahold seized his neighbours' lands themselves, as a result King Béla IV of Hungary personally forced him to return the lands to the Gyüres. Through the mediation of Csák Hahót, the ispán of Zala County, Hahold made peace with the Gyüre kindred in November 1267. According to the agreement, Hahold and his opponents divided among themselves an unidentified land. Then it was agreed that Hahold, with his two sons and his wife, would swear in his own house before the testimony of the chapter of Vasvár and the king's man, Master Pós (Pous), the clerk of the royal court, that he would not maintain a hostile relationship with the Gyüre clan, which Csák and other members of the Hahót clan swore an oath. Hahold undertook to pay damages of 25 marks and also had to return the three horses of Thomas Gyüre until the deadline of January 1268. In addition, Hahold and his familia undertook to go into the Vasvár jail for a single day,  and after leaving the prison, apologize to the Gyüres.

In 1272, he called himself "lord of Alsólendva" (today Lendava, Slovenia), proving that he owned and possibly built the castle himself by then. During the Bohemian–Hungarian War, when Ottokar II of Bohemia invaded the kingdom in the spring of 1272, his forts Lenti and Alsólendva were besieged and demolished.

Through his son Stephen, he was a forefather of the powerful Bánfi de Alsólendva noble family. In the same year, Hahold made land donation to the Vasvár monastery, and swore his son Matthew to reserve that. Hahold died sometime between 1275 and 1278.

References

Sources

 
 
 
 

1270s deaths
13th-century Hungarian people
Hahold 04